{{speciesbox
|image = 
|image_caption = 
|genus = Thryptomene
|species = cuspidata
|authority = (Turcz.) J.W.Green 
|synonyms_ref = 
|synonyms =
 Paryphantha cuspidata Turcz. 
 Thryptomene tenella <small>Benth. nom. illeg., nom. superfl. </small>
}}Thryptomene cuspidata is a species of flowering plant in the family Myrtaceae and is endemic to Western Australia.

The species was first formally described in 1852 by Nikolai Turczaninow and given the name Paryphantha cuspidata in the Bulletin de la classe physico-mathematique de l'Academie Imperiale des sciences de Saint-Petersburg. In 1985, John Green changed the name to Thryptomene cuspidata.Thryptomene cuspidata'' is found on plains and among granite outcrops in the Avon Wheatbelt, Coolgardie, Geraldton Sandplains and Mallee biogeographic regions in the south-west of Western Australia where it grows in sandy to gravelly soils.

References

cuspidata
Endemic flora of Western Australia
Rosids of Western Australia
Plants described in 1985